Mr. Barnes of New York is a 1914 American silent drama film directed by Maurice Costello and Robert Gaillard and starring Costello, Mary Charleson and Darwin Karr. It is an adaptation of Archibald Clavering Gunter's novel of the same name.

Cast

References

Bibliography
 Goble, Alan. The Complete Index to Literary Sources in Film. Walter de Gruyter, 1999.

External links
 
 Movie Program(archived)

1914 films
1914 drama films
1910s English-language films
American silent feature films
Silent American drama films
Films based on American novels
American black-and-white films
Vitagraph Studios films
Films directed by Maurice Costello
Films directed by Robert Gaillard
1910s American films